Arzel is a surname. It may refer to:

Alphonse Arzel (1927–2014), French politician and senator
Gildas Arzel (born 1961), French singer, songwriter, composer and multi-instrumentalist musician

See also
Marguerite Lamour, birth name Marguerite Arzel, French politician and mayor